The Buffalo Blizzard was a soccer club that existed from 1992 to 2001 in Buffalo, New York.

History
The team was originally owned by the Knox brothers who owned the Buffalo Sabres at the time, and additionally by the Riches who owned the minor league baseball Buffalo Bisons.  During their last five years of existence, the team was owned by John Bellanti who had previously owned the Buffalo Stallions of the original Major Indoor Soccer League.

The team's attendance was always in the top five of the league until its last season, and they had their record high attendance year in 1993–1994 season with an average attendance of 8,435 fans. The major stars of the team were the Pikuzinski brothers, Rudy and Randy, who rank sixth and ninth on the all-time points list. The team colors were blue, purple, black, and white, and the team mascot was a dog Spyke who rode a four-wheeler. The team never won a playoff series.

The NPSL ceased operation in 2001 and several of its remaining teams formed the Major Indoor Soccer League, but the Blizzard declined to participate and folded at that time.

Year-by-year record

Coaches
1992–1994:  Trevor Dawkins 
1994–1996:  Jim May 
1996–1997:  George Fernandez
1997–1998:  Carlos Salguero
1998–1999:  Jim May 
1999–2001:  Paul Kitson

Players
 Rudy Pikuzinski 1992-2000
 Randy Pikuzinski 1992-2001

Year by year average game attendance
1992/93: 7,068
1993/94: 8,435
1994/95: 7,283
1995/96: 6,364
1996/97: 7,974
1997/98: 7,834
1998/99: 7,068
1999/00: 6,587
2000/01: 4,635

References

Sports in Buffalo, New York
Defunct indoor soccer clubs in the United States
National Professional Soccer League (1984–2001) teams
Association football clubs established in 1992
Men's soccer clubs in New York (state)
1992 establishments in New York (state)
2001 disestablishments in New York (state)
Association football clubs disestablished in 2001